Albert Osswald (16 May 1919 – 15 August 1996) was a German politician (SPD). He served as the 3rd Minister President of the state of Hesse from 1969 to 1976 and as the 27th President of the Bundesrat in 1975/76.

Biography 
Oswald was born as the son of a mason in Giessen. After elementary and secondary school in Giessen, he attended a vocational school for salesmen. During World War II he was a soldier of the German army.

In 1945, he joined the Social Democratic Party of Germany. After local offices in Giessen, he was elected to the parliament of Hesse in 1954. From 1962 to 1969, he served as minister in the government of Hesse, first as minister of economic affairs, later as minister of finance. Osswald was elected prime minister of Hesse in 1969, after the demission of Georg August Zinn. His government had an absolute majority in the beginning. From 1970 on, Osswald headed a coalition government of SPD and FDP. After a financial scandal involving the public bank Helaba, Osswald resigned as prime minister of Hesse in October 1976. He retired from all political offices in 1977.

A native of Gießen, Osswald supported the creation of the city of Lahn in 1977 - born out of a merger of Gießen and Wetzlar, describing it as "Work of the Century" (Jahrhundertwerk) as it would strengthen the Central Hesse against the two major population centers of Kassel in the north of the state and Frankfurt in the south. However, the merger would prove to be unpopular and following SPD's defeat in the 1977 local elections in Lahn in favor of CDU opposed to the city of Lahn, the merger was rescinded in 1979.

Osswald died during a hiking vacation in Schwangau in 1996.

References 

1919 births
1996 deaths
Presidents of the German Bundesrat
Social Democratic Party of Germany politicians
Grand Crosses with Star and Sash of the Order of Merit of the Federal Republic of Germany
Ministers-President of Hesse